Furlong Creek is a stream in the U.S. state of South Dakota.

Furlong Creek has the name of Thomas Furlong, a pioneer who settled near it.

See also
List of rivers of South Dakota

References

Rivers of Hutchinson County, South Dakota
Rivers of South Dakota